is a Japanese announcer who is represented by the talent agency, Sankei. She is also a professor of Josai International University.

Filmography

TV and radio series

Former
Regular appearances

Other appearances

Stage shows

Advertisements

Other

References

External links
 
Official profile 

Japanese announcers
1974 births
Living people
People from Fukushima Prefecture